Liga de Desenvolvimento de Basquete (LDB) (English: Developmental Basketball League) is an Under-20 age version of the top-tier level Brazilian men's professional basketball league, the Novo Basquete Brasil (NBB). The players need to be 20 years old and under to play in this tournament. It is a way to discover new players for future Brazilian national team generations, and for new young talents to be developed for the main teams of the Novo Basquete Brasil (NBB).

However, not all the teams that make up the NBB also compete in the LDB, due to not having competitive teams in the lower Brazilian basketball league categories. So some teams focus instead on the training of their young athletes, or participate as guests, and can still help to produce good future players for Brazilian basketball. LDB receives support from the Brazilian Federal Government to be organized.

Format
The LDB was an Under-21 competition in the 2011–12 season, an Under-22 competition from the 2012–13 season to the 2016–17 season, and has been and Under-20 competition since the 2017–18 season. It is organized according to the rules of FIBA for international competitions: the participating teams are divided into groups of 8 teams each. The teams in each group play against each other, and the three best teams from each group qualify to advance to the next phase, which is a 6 team group stage. The top four teams of that group then advance to the Final Four. The best team of the Final Four is crowned the champion.

LDB Finals

MVP by edition

References

External links
Official website 
Latinbasket.com League Profile

2011 establishments in Brazil
Basketball leagues in Brazil
Sports leagues established in 2011
Professional sports leagues in Brazil